"Clandestino" (English: "Clandestine") is a song by Colombian singer-songwriter Shakira and Colombian singer Maluma, released on 8 June 2018 as a stand-alone single. Shakira and Maluma worked on the song in April 2018 in Spain. It was written and produced by the two singers and Edgar Barrera. The song was intendedly released as the lead single from Shakira's upcoming twelfth studio album according to Rolling Stone, but was scrapped from the album for unknown reasons. The song reached number one in Colombia, Costa Rica, Bolivia, Mexico, Panama, Paraguay, Puerto Rico and Uruguay.

Background 
Shakira and Maluma worked on the song in April 2018 in Barcelona, Spain, while Maluma was there for a Billboard photoshoot with Shakira. This is the fourth collaboration between the two Colombian artists, following the remix of Carlos Vives and Shakira's "La Bicicleta", "Chantaje" and "Trap".

Music video
The music video was filmed between June 26 and 27 on a beach in Sitges, a town near Barcelona, the location of the song's recording, and was released on July 27, 2018. The video gained five million views in its first 24 hours.

Commercial performance
In the United States, "Clandestino" debuted at number 17 on the Hot Latin Songs chart, with first week sales of 5,000 copies. In Spain, the song debuted at number 24 on the Promusicae official singles chart and reached number 13. In Italy, it debuted at number 76, while in Switzerland, the song entered at number 32.

Reception
Rolling Stone ranked the song at number six on their list of "20 Best Latin Singles of 2018". The song made Idolator's list of "The 100 Best Singles Of 2018" at number 18 calling it "the ultimate grower". The song was also ranked at number 14 on Billboards critics' picks "The 20 Best Latin Songs of 2018".

Accolades

Charts

Weekly charts

Year-end charts

Certifications

See also
List of Billboard number-one Latin songs of 2018

References

2018 songs
2018 singles
Shakira songs
Maluma songs
Spanish-language songs
Songs written by Shakira
Songs written by Maluma (singer)
Songs written by Edgar Barrera